Der Wildschütz oder Die Stimme der Natur (The Poacher, or The Voice of Nature) is a German Komische Oper, or comic opera, in three acts by Albert Lortzing from a libretto by the composer adapted from the comedy Der Rehbock, oder Die schuldlosen Schuldbewussten by August von Kotzebue. It had its premiere at the Stadttheater in Leipzig on 31 December 1842.

Roles

Synopsis

Act 1
At the village hotel, the schoolmaster Baculus is celebrating his engagement to Gretchen.  A hunter from the Count von Eberbach then arrives at the festivities with a letter telling Baculus that he has been dismissed from his schoolmaster post, as Baculus had earlier gone hunting on the count's land without his permission.  Baculus thinks to send Gretchen to change the count's mind, but then recalls the count's weakness for young women.  The Baroness von Freimann, sister of the count and recently widowed, arrives disguised as a student to travel incognito.  Her brother wants her to remarry with Baron Kronthal.  The Baroness hears of Baculus's misfortune, and offers herself to plead his case in place of Gretchen.  The Count then comes on the scene with his shooting party, as does Baron Kronthal.  Both the Count and the baron are immediately attracted to Gretchen.  The entire party is then gathered for the count's birthday celebration at his castle.

Act 2
The Countess von Eberbach has a weakness for ancient tragedies, particularly Sophocles, and she bores her servant when she expounds on them.  Pancratius, the house master, advises Baculus to exploit this feature to gain favour with the countess.  Baculus impresses the countess with quotations from these ancient literary works.  However, the Count sees this and tries to banish Baculus from the proceedings.  Baculus then tries to enlist the Baroness with the idea of her appearing as Gretchen, in disguise.  A storm then arises, and this forces Baculus and Gretchen to remain locked in the castle.  During a billiards party, the lights suddenly go out.  The Count and the Baron take the opportunity to surprise Gretchen.  However, the Countess helps Baculus and Gretchen to escape.  The baron then offers a reward of 5000 Taler for delivering Gretchen to him.

Act 3
The Count's birthday celebration is continuing.  The "correct" Gretchen is now brought to the castle.  The Baron notices that Gretchen seems different from before.  Baculus then reveals that the "previous" Gretchen was a student in disguise.  After Baculus is pressed further, the Baroness reveals her true identity.  The Baron demands an explanation from Baculus, and later the Count adds his voice to ask for clarification.  The countess eventually arrives as well.  The confusion is finally clarified.  In the end, Baculus and Gretchen are reunited, and Baculus is restored to his schoolmaster position.  It also turns out that Baculus had accidentally shot his own donkey initially, rather than a deer on the count's grounds.

Complete recordings
key: conductor/baronin/gretchen/gräfin/kronthal/eberbach/baculus
Hans Müller-Kray/Wissmann/Nentwig/Münch/Fehringer/Rehfuss/Kurt Böhme - 1954, Süddeutscher Rundfunk
Wallberg/Seefried/Holm/Rössl-Majdan/Kmentt/Völker/Dönch - 1960, live in Vienna, Orfeo
Robert Heger/Anneliese Rothenberger/Lotte Schädle/Litz/Fritz Wunderlich/Hermann Prey/Fritz Ollendorff, Bavarian State Orchestra - 1963, EMI CMS 7 63205 2, reed. 0946-3-81837-2-3
Bernhard Klee/Edith Mathis/Georgine Resick/Doris Soffel/Peter Schreier/Gottfried Hornik/Hans Sotin, Staatskapelle Berlin - 1982, Deutsche Grammophon 2740-271
Eschwé/Dorn/Ullrich/Brohm/Davislim/Roth/Zeppenfeld - 2015, live in Dresden

References
Sources
 
 Warrack, John; Ewan West, The Oxford Dictionary of Opera (1992),  782 pages,  

German-language operas
Operas by Albert Lortzing
1842 operas
Operas